John Michael Talbot (born May 8, 1954) is an American Christian musician, author, television presenter and founder of a monastic community known as the Brothers and Sisters of Charity.

Life and career
Talbot was born into a Methodist family with a musical background in Oklahoma City, Oklahoma, and started learning to play the guitar at an early age. At age 15, he dropped out of school and was performing as a guitarist for Mason Proffit, a country folk-rock band formed with his older brother Terry.

Talbot embarked on a spiritual journey that led him through Native American religion and Buddhism and finally to Christianity. At this point, he and his brother, Terry, joined the Jesus movement and recorded the album Reborn, which was re-released by Sparrow Records (originally released as The Talbot Brothers on the Warner Brothers label).

Two solo albums followed for Talbot: John Michael Talbot (1976) and The New Earth (1977). Both of these were recorded at Golden Voice Recording Studio in South Pekin, Illinois, and produced by Billy Ray Hearn. Reading the life of Saint Francis of Assisi, he was inspired to begin studying at a Franciscan center in Indianapolis. He then became a Catholic Christian and joined the Secular Franciscan Order in 1978. His new beliefs influenced his next solo albums, The Lord's Supper (1979) and its follow-up, Come to the Quiet (1980). In the years that followed, he continually released new albums and became the best-selling artist in the history of Sparrow Records.

He started a house of prayer called "The Little Portion". Talbot moved The Little Portion to Berryville, Arkansas, on land he had purchased during his Mason Proffit days. He founded his own community, the Brothers and Sisters of Charity, at Little Portion Hermitage as an "integrated monastic community" with celibate brothers and sisters, singles, and families. By 1989, Talbot had married Viola Pratka (with the permission of the Catholic Church), a former Incarnate Word Sister who had come to the community in 1986.

In accordance with the community's general constitutions, Talbot's title is "General Minister and Spiritual Father". For many years, he has promoted the work of Mercy Corps.

The hermitage suffered a fire in April 2008 in which the chapel, library and many common areas were destroyed. On April 10, 2010, the Bishop of Little Rock, Anthony Taylor, dedicated the new buildings. On October 2, 2010, the Brothers and Sisters of Charity at Little Portion Hermitage celebrated the opening of the new monastery church and common center.

Talbot is the host of an inspirational television program, All Things Are Possible, on The Church Channel which is owned and operated by the Trinity Broadcasting Network.

See also
 Contemporary Catholic liturgical music

Discography

With Mason Proffit

* double album reissue of Wanted and Movin' Toward Happiness

Solo

Collections
1980 Beginnings
1989 Master Collection V1 - The Quiet Side
1995 Collection
1995 The Talbot Brothers Collection
2003 Signatures
2003 History Makers
2008 The Troubadour Years

Bibliography

Books
St. Romuald's Hermitage of the Heart: 40 Days to Peace, Prayer, and the Presence of God — (Book Baby) (2021)
The Music of Creation:  Foundations of a Christian Life — (Tarcher/Putnam) (1999) 
Changes: A Spiritual Journal — (Troubadour For The Lord) 
Blessings: Reflections On The Beatitudes — (Crossroads Publishing) 
Come to the Quiet: The Principles Of Christian Meditation — (J.P. Tarcher) 
The Fire of God – (Troubadour for the Lord) 
Hermitage: A Place Of Prayer & Spiritual Renewal — (Troubadour For The Lord) 
Simplicity (with Dan O'Neill) 
The Joy of Music Ministry (Resurrection Press) 
Lessons of St. Francis: Bring Simplicity & Spirituality Into Your Daily Life — (Plume Books) 
The Lover and the Beloved: A Way Of Franciscan Prayer — (Troubadour For The Lord) 
Meditations From Solitude: A Mystical Theology From The Christian East — (Troubadour For The Lord) 
Reflections on the Gospels, Vol. 1: Daily Devotions For Radical Christian Living – (Troubadour for the Lord) 
Reflections on the Gospels, Vol. 2: Daily Devotions For Radical Christian Living – (Troubadour for the Lord) 
Reflections on the Gospels, VOL. 3: A Passion For God – (Servant Publications) 
Signatures (with Dan O'Neill) – (Troubadour for the Lord) 
The Way of the Mystics: Ancient Wisdom For Today (with Steve Rabey) — (Jossey-Bass)
Reflections on Saint Francis (Liturgical Press) 
The World Is My Cloister: Living from the Hermit Within' (Orbis Books) The Universal Monk: The Way of the New Monastic (Liturgical Press) Blessings of Saint Benedict (Liturgical Press) The Jesus Prayer - A Cry For Mercy, A Path of Renewal (Inter-Varsity Press) Nothing Is Impossible With God (Dynamic Catholic) 

Video releasesAll Things Are Possible With God (2014, Troubadour for the Lord)Nothing Is Impossible (2012, Troubadour for the Lord)Live in Concert (2001, Troubadour for the Lord)Quiet Reflections (1991, Santa Fe Communications, Inc.)

Information sourcesTroubadour for the Lord: The Story of John Michael Talbot by Dan O'Neill — (Crossroad Publishing) (1983) Signatures: The Story Of John Michael Talbot'' by Dan O'Neill — (Troubadour For The Lord) (2004)  (revised version of his earlier biography "Troubadour for the Lord")

References

External links
 
 Little Portion Community website
 Review: Monk Rock at The-Trades.com

1954 births
Living people
20th-century American singers
20th-century American non-fiction writers
20th-century Roman Catholics
21st-century American singers
21st-century American non-fiction writers
21st-century Roman Catholics
American Christian writers
American male singer-songwriters
American male non-fiction writers
American performers of Christian music
Contemporary Catholic liturgical music
Converts to Roman Catholicism from Evangelicalism
Founders of Catholic religious communities
Musicians from Oklahoma City
People from Berryville, Arkansas
Secular Franciscans
Catholics from Arkansas
20th-century American male writers
21st-century American male writers
20th-century American male singers
21st-century American male singers
Singer-songwriters from Oklahoma
Singer-songwriters from Arkansas